Johannes Dörfler (born 23 August 1996) is a German professional footballer who plays as a winger for  club Waldhof Mannheim on loan from SC Paderborn.

Club career
For the 2022–23 season, Dörfler joined Waldhof Mannheim on loan.

References

External links
 Profile at kicker.de
 
 Johannes Dörfler at FuPa

1996 births
Living people
German footballers
Association football wingers
MSV Duisburg II players
KFC Uerdingen 05 players
SC Paderborn 07 players
FSV Zwickau players
SV Waldhof Mannheim players
2. Bundesliga players
3. Liga players
Regionalliga players
Footballers from Düsseldorf